Datuk Seri Panglima Wilfred Madius Tangau (born 13 March 1958) is a Malaysian politician who has served as the Member of Parliament (MP) for Tuaran from November 1999 to March 2008 and again since May 2013. He served as the Deputy Chief Minister and State Minister of Trade and Industry of Sabah in the Sabah Heritage Party (WARISAN) state administration from May 2018 to the collapse of the WARISAN administration in September 2020, Minister of Science, Technology and Innovation from July 2015 to May 2018. He is a member of the United Progressive Kinabalu Organisation (UPKO), a component party of the PH coalition. He has served as the Honorary President of UPKO since January 2023, 2nd President of UPKO from March 2014 to January 2023, when he served in the official capacity from September 2018 to January 2023 and acting capacity from March 2014 following the resignation of Bernard Giluk Dompok to his official assumption of UPKO presidency in September 2018.

Early life 
Tangau was born in 1958 in Kampung Lokos, Kiulu, Tuaran, Sabah, into a Kadazandusun family where his parents were cultivators of hill paddy. He is the fourth child of 14 siblings. Upon completing his primary school education at SRK Lokos, Kiulu in 1970, he was determined to continue his education despite initial objections from his parents due to financial constraints.

With his own savings, he enrolled in SMK Kiulu for Bridge Class to Form Two. To support himself in school, he took up a manual job as a rubber tapper on weekends. He was also employed by a Chinese “towkay”, a term for business owners, in Kiulu town, which at that time only had a row of shops. He then could save on food and rental.

He often speaks of his childhood fondly:

At the end of Form Two he was awarded a Boarding Scholarship from the Sabah State Government to further his studies in SMK Ranau in Form Three in 1974. With the good results he obtained in the Lower Certificate of Education (LCE) he was granted a Sabah State Government Scholarship to pursue Form Four at Setapak High School, Selangor, the year after.

Inspired by fellow schoolmates in this school, he initiated a student society in his village called KEPALOS, which formed student study groups and fundraised to finance their programmes. In 1976, Tangau passed his Malaysian Certificate of Education (MCE) with Grade One. With this he earned the same scholarship to do his Form Six at Sekolah Menengah Sains Selangor (SMSS) Cheras, a governmental fully residential school. At SMSSah, he was an active student leader and a debater for his school. Prior to his tertiary education while waiting for the results of his Higher School Certificate, he served as a temporary teacher at SMK Tamparuli, Sabah, for five months. He taught Integrated Science or Sains Paduan to Form One students.

In 1979, having successfully completed his Higher School Certificate, Tangau was accepted into University Pertanian Malaysia (UPM), Selangor, to do his bachelor's degree in Forestry Science. He was an active student leader at university. He was the President of the Catholic Student Society for two terms from 1981 to 1982. He was also a keen observer of the political development of his birth state Sabah, and nationwide. He graduated in 1983 and soon after, he secured a job at the Sabah Forestry Development Authority (SAFODA) as a research officer on silviculture. In 1985 he was accepted as an individual participant to study forest management in various institutions in Japan under the Japan International Cooperation Agency (JICA) for four months. He had the opportunity to travel and stay in Tokyo, Kumamoto, Numata, Hokkaido and Tsukuba. Subsequently, in 1990 he obtained a master's degree in Development Management from Asian Institute of Management (AIM) in the Philippines.

He is married to Datuk (Datin Seri Panglima) Dr. Jaina Sintian, who is the founding Vice Chief of the UPKO Women Movement Chief (UPKO Wanita, later the Chief 2008 and retired in 2018 when the husband was elected officially as the President of UPKO. Together  they have five children - four daughters, and a son.

Prior to politics 
Shortly after graduating from UPM, Tangau was sent to Japan for a four-month training stint in various research institutions. Upon returning to Sabah in 1985 he assisted Parti Bersatu Sabah (PBS) as a backroom boy to form the new Sabah government. He joined the newly set up Institute for Development Studies (IDS) Sabah as a research associate, and served for nine years until 1994.

When BN toppled PBS in 1994, Tangau assisted leaders who left the party to form Parti Demokratik Sabah (PDS). For the next five years Tangau served as the Chief Executive Officer at the Institute for Indigenous Economic Progress (INDEP) Sabah, a think-tank set established by PDS. The objective of INDEP was to engage Pasokmomogun community groups in Sabah in policymaking and assist UPKO leaders in decision-makings.

Tangau was appointed as Chairman of several federal agencies and state linked companies such as Sabah Cultural Board (LKNS, Forest Plantation Development Sdn. Bhd., Malaysian Timber Industrial Board (MTIB) and Asian Supply Sdn. Bhd.(ASB) Tangau was also on the board of Suria Capital Berhad, Sabah Energy Corporation Sdn. Bhd.

Political career 
In the 1999 state elections in Sabah, 10 of the 12 PDS candidates who contested were defeated. Due to this devastating defeat Tangau was requested by the party leadership to contest in the 1999 parliamentary general election, effectively thrusting him from backroom boy to mainstream politics.

Tangau was elected as the Member of Parliament for Tuaran for the first time in November 1999 and again in 2004. He did not contest in the 12th Malaysian Parliament to make way for then UPKO deputy president Datuk Wilfred Bumburing to contest.

In the 13th General Elections held in 2013 he was once again elected as the Member of Parliament for Tuaran and won by a majority of over 5,000 votes.

Tangau has been involved in UPKO since the party's early days. Shortly after he was first elected as an MP he became the Information Chief. He was then appointed the secretary general in 2002.

In 2012 the deputy president post fell vacant when Datuk Wilfred Bumburing quit UPKO to join the Opposition Pakatan Rakyat coalition. Tangau was elected the deputy president in October 2013, beating Datuk Dr Ewon Ebin, UPKO vice-president, with a slim majority.

In March 2014 the founding president Tan Sri Bernard Dompok stepped down, nearly 10 months after he lost the Penampang parliamentary seat in the last general election. Since then Tangau has been serving as the Acting President of UPKO until he won the president post uncontested at the party triennial general meetings on 24 September 2018.

Ministerial career 
Prime Minister Datuk Seri Najib Razak announced a new Cabinet line-up on 28 July 2015, involving the appointment of seven new ministers and nine deputy ministers. Tangau was appointed as the Minister of Science, Technology and Innovation. He was sworn in by the Yang di-Pertuan Agong on 4 August 2015.

Tangau's vision for the Ministry has been for science, technology and innovation to be drivers of the “new economy”, or the Fourth Industrial Revolution. He actively promoted innovation as a way of life. Practical problems in life, especially those economic challenges should be properly identified and then innovate to resolved them using science and technologies. Innovators should be encouraged to secure Intellectual Property (IP) for their innovation and then the government should incentivised them to commercialised such that it will generate wealth and create jobs for the people. He started the National Innovation and Creative Economy (NICE) Expo in 2017.  He blogs regularly at www.wilfredmadiustangau.com. He writes for a column every Sunday in The Daily Express, the largest daily newspaper in Sabah, expressing his thoughts about the advancement of science, technology and innovation in the country.

Later career 
In the aftermath of 2018 general election, UPKO under his leadership decided to quit Barisan Nasional and joined the Pakatan Harapan-Warisan government bloc both federally and at the state, citing the popular aspiration for change. Tangau was appointed as nominated assemblyman to serve as Deputy Chief Minister of Sabah in the Shafie Apdal cabinet and remained so until the coalition lost snap election in 2020.

Honours

Honours of Malaysia
  :
  Companion of the Order of Loyalty to the Crown of Malaysia (JSM) (2003)
  :
  Commander of the Order of Kinabalu (PGDK) – Datuk (2005)
  Grand Commander of the Order of Kinabalu (SPDK) – Datuk Seri Panglima (2015)

Election results

See also
Tuaran (federal constituency)

External links

References 

1958 births
Living people
People from Sabah
Kadazan-Dusun people
Malaysian Christians
Malaysian Roman Catholics
Sabah politicians
Leaders of political parties in Malaysia
Members of the Dewan Rakyat
Government ministers of Malaysia
Grand Commanders of the Order of Kinabalu
Companions of the Order of Loyalty to the Crown of Malaysia
21st-century Malaysian politicians
Commanders of the Order of Kinabalu